The Midnight Man is a 2016 horror film directed by Travis Zariwny and starring Gabrielle Haugh, Lin Shaye and Grayson Gabriel.

Cast
Gabrielle Haugh as Alex Luster
Callie Lane as Young Alex
Lin Shaye as Anna Luster
Summer Howell as Young Annie
Grayson Gabriel as Miles
Robert Englund as Dr. Harding
Logan Crenan as Young Dr. Harding
Emily Haine as Kelly
Abigail Pniowsky as Young Kelly
Kyle Strauts as The Midnight Man
Louise Linton as Annie Luster
Michael Sirow as Allen
Meredith Rose as Mary
Keenan Lehmann as Max

Production
Producer Cassian Elwes first acquired the rights to a remake of the 2013 film Midnight Man, by Irish director Rob Kennedy, after seeing the film at a festival. Soon after, Elwes courted production designer turned director Travis Zariwny to helm the film. Along with Kennedy's film, Zariwny noted similarities with his own film to The Midnight Game, saying "the most terrifying thing as a filmmaker, is while I’m writing a story somebody else is making the movie that I’m writing". By March 2016, Lin Shaye and Robert Englund boarded the film, rounding out a cast including Gabrielle Haugh, Grayson Gabriel, Summer Howell, Keenan Lehmann, Meredith Rose, Kyle Strauts, and Michael Sirow. Production began that same month in Winnipeg. According to Zariwny, a full day of filming and $80,000 were lost during production due to a drop in the US dollar and a raise in the Canadian dollar.

Release
The Midnight Man first debuted in Canada on September 30, 2016. The film remained dormant until IFC Midnight bought the distribution rights, setting the release date for January 22, 2018. The film released on VOD on January 19, 2018.

Home Media
Shout Factory released the film on Blu-ray and DVD on June 5, 2018.

Reception
On review aggregator Rotten Tomatoes, The Midnight Man holds an approval rating of 27%, with an average rating of 4.50/10, based on 11 reviews.

Sara Michelle Fetters of MovieFreak praised the production design and claimed the film was a step up from Zariwny's Cabin Fever and Intruder, she criticized the monster's rules and called the ending "unintentionally laughable". Frank Schenk, for The Hollywood Reporter, said the film was "derivative" and "forgettable". For Dread Central, Matt Donato wrote "The Midnight Man is largely a robotic hide-and-seek slog".

Writing for FilmInquiry, Stephanie Archer complimented the performances of Shaye and Englund and Gavin Kelly's cinematography. Of TheFrightFile, Dustin Putman wrote "The Midnight Man isn't exactly deep and the film is not quite sure how to stick the landing, but as a trifle offering a stylish sheen and a handful of effective chills it proves more successful than not."

External links

References

2016 horror films
2010s supernatural films
2016 films
American horror films
2010s English-language films
Films directed by Travis Zariwny
2010s American films